The Frankland Range is a mountain range that is located in the south-west region of Tasmania, Australia. The range forms part of a natural south-western border to the impounded Lake Pedder, formed by the damming of the Serpentine and Huon rivers.

As part of the South West Wilderness area, it is a less popular site of bushwalking than other, more famous, ranges in Tasmania's South West, and is for much more advanced walkers due to its length, isolation and terrain. Access routes to the range are by boat from the lake, or the roads at Strathgordon or Scotts Peak Dam.

Nearby ranges include the Arthur, Companion, Folded, Tribulation, and the Wilmot ranges.

Notable peaks

See also

List of mountain ranges in Tasmania

References

External links
 http://tqft.net/wiki/Frankland_Range

Mountain ranges of Tasmania
Lake Pedder